Dmitry Nikolayevich Sadovnikov (Дмитрий Николаевич Садовников, 7 May 1847 in Simbirsk, Russian Empire – 31 December 1883 in Saint Petersburg, Russian Empire) was a Russian poet, folklorist and ethnographer.

Among his major works were acclaimed compilations «Загадки русского народа» [The Mysteries of Russian People] (1876), "The Pagan Dreams of Russia" (1882) and «Записки Императорского Русского географического общества» [Fables and Legends of the Samara Region] (1884).

Works
Notable works include :

«Русская земля, Жегули и Усолье на Волге» [Russian land, Zheguli and Usolye on the Volga], (in journal «Беседа», 1872, № 11 и 12), 
«Подвиги русских людей» [Heroic deeds of Russian people] (in «Грамотей», 1873, № 1, 2, 3, 8, 11 и 12)
«Загадки русского народа» [The Mysteries of Russian People] (1876)
«Языческие сны русского народа»  [The Pagan Dreams of Russia] (1882), text book
 «Наши землепроходцы» [Our Explorers] (1874, 2nd ed. 1897), text book
«Из летней поездки по Волге» [From a summer trip along the Volga] (in «Век», 1883, Book I) 
«Сказки и предания Самарского края» [Fables and Legends of the Samara Region] (in «Записки Императорского Русского географического общества» [Imperial Russian Geographical Society journal] vol.12) (1884)

He also wrote poetry under the pseudonyms Д. Волжанин and Жанрист.

Legacy
The poetic legacy of Sadovnikov who died in poverty and has never received wide recognition, is generally underrated. For one, D.S. Mirsky considered him "worthy of mention", and claimed him to be the second Russian poet of the 1870s after Nekrasov.

Sadovnikov has never received due credit even for his most famous poem, Iz-za ostrova na strezhen ("The Carnival is Over"). Set to a popular folk melody, this piece about ataman Stenka Razin is widely considered to be part of Russian musical folklore.

References

External links
"Iz-za ostrova na strezhen" (Из-за острова на стрежень) by Anna German.

1847 births
1883 deaths
People from Ulyanovsk
Russian male poets
Russian folklorists
19th-century poets
19th-century male writers from the Russian Empire